Makówki (Lower Silesian: Mohn Kließla) is a sweet poppy seed-based bread dessert from Central Europe. The dish is considered traditional in Silesia (southwestern Poland), where it is served almost exclusively on Christmas Eve. It is also popular in other parts of Poland as well as in eastern Germany, Slovakia and in Hungary.

Outside Silesia
Makówki are also well known in Brandenburg and Berlin under the name Mohnpielen. Theodor Fontane in his travels through the Margraviate of Brandenburg wrote about Mohnpielen and other dishes.

A similar dish made with slices of Kifli (Kipferl) in Hungary is called .

In Poland, outside of the Silesia region, the dish is widely known as makiełki. This is particularly common in Poznań and in Łódź (Lodz), where Silesian migrants settled during the Industrial Revolution in the 19th century.

Preparation
The main ingredients are sweet white bread and finely ground poppy seeds boiled in milk with butter. Other important ingredients include dried fruit (figs, raisins, apricots, dates, etc.), almonds and other kinds of nuts (the choice of nuts and dried fruit varies).  It is flavoured with sugar, honey, vanilla, cinnamon and rum.

The bread is cut into thin slices and layered in a clay pot or more often a glass or crystal bowl. After each layer, the sauce of the boiled poppy seeds, with flavouring and nuts, is poured so that the bread is well soaked. The top is decorated with some extra nuts and fruit. The dish is served cold, at least several hours after preparation.

Significance in Silesia
Silesian cuisine can be very conservative. The tradition of serving makówki/mohnkließla/mohnpielen is well maintained among Silesian peoples and it is difficult to imagine a Silesian Christmas without the dish. By the elders, it would be considered unorthodox to prepare it outside the Christmas—New Year period. Preparing makówki outside Silesia can be difficult due to the unavailability of finely ground poppy seed (a special mill is usually required). In the United States, canned poppy paste is sometimes commercially available and can be used.

See also

 Opekance
 List of desserts

Notes

External links

Silesian cuisine
Polish desserts
German cuisine
German desserts
Desserts
Christmas food
Poppy seeds
Hungarian desserts
Slovak cuisine
Yeast breads
Sweet breads